Anchal post was the early postal service started  in the kingdom of  Travancore  and Cochin before Independence of India. It was started in Travancore in 1729 by Anizham thirunal Marthandavarma and later in Cochin in 1770s. Later it was merged with the India Posts & Telegraph on 1 April 1951 after Independence of India.

Etymology 
The name Anchal derives from the Greek word Angelos meaning messenger. (Greek. Angelos) an angel, a messenger who runs on foot, the bearer of despatches. It is believed that name Anchal was given to the early post by General John Munro, the then Resident Diwan of Travancore.

Anchal symbol 
The symbol of Anchal post is Shankha.

Anchal post boxes 

These pillar boxes are made of cast iron, are about 100 cm tall and hexagonal in shape. The letter box features the State emblem, the Shankha. A pair of smaller Shankha are seen on either side of the mail slot. The words Travancore Anchal, Anchal letter box, letters taken are embossed and at the centre of the box is a Shankha emblem. Also it shows what time the letter is cleared out from the box. These letter boxes, each weighing about 715 kilograms, could take about 3000 letters and small packets. The manufacturer's name, Massey & Co, Madras is embossed on them.

Anchal runner 
The early post man of Travancore & Cochin were called as Anchal pillai. In olden days the Anchal pillai was running with the postal bag carrying on his head and with a two-foot staff on his hand on which bells are attached. His uniform was Khaki shorts, Khaki shirt and a Khaki hat with red lining on it. When the Anchal man comes running everybody move away hearing the bell sound to make his way. Legally the mail man had a priority then. The carriage of post was like a relay running of Anchal men.

Important events 
The first Anchal post office was opened in 1852 in Alappuzha at the time of Uthram thirunal Marthandavarma. A telegraph was introduced in Travancore in 1863. A postal savings scheme started in 1912 at the time of the Diwan Raghava Iyer. The money order service was started in 1901 and an insurance scheme commenced in 1921

Gallery

References

External links 

Postal system of India
Philately of India
Communications in Kerala
Kingdom of Travancore